Blasphemy is the ninth studio album by American avant-garde metal band Kayo Dot. It was released on September 6, 2019 via Prophecy Productions.

Critical reception 

Treblezine gave Blasphemy a positive review, calling it "one of the best pieces of avant-garde music in recent memory" while dubbing it "a challenging listen" with "the backbones of songs largely buried, unearthing themselves only after several listens". Sputnikmusic awarded the album a score of 3/5, noting its "wonky and unique progressive rock style" and praising Driver's "highly impressive and versatile singing performance".

Track listing

Personnel 
 Toby Driver – guitar, bass, synths, vocals, percussion, electronics and production
 Ron Varod – guitar
 Leonardo Didkovsky – drums
 Phillip Price – drums
 Tim Byrnes – trumpet on "Turbine, Hook, and Haul"
 Timm Mason – additional synth design

References 

2019 albums
Kayo Dot albums